The Black Panther is a 1921 German silent film directed by Johannes Guter and starring Yelena Polevitskaya, Xenia Desni and Eugen Burg. The film was produced by Russo Film, a small production outfit associated with Decla-Bioscop, which had been set up to produce films based on literature. The film was adapted from a play by Volodymyr Vynnychenko. It premiered on 14 October 1921 at a Decla cinema on the Unter den Linden.

Cast

References

Bibliography

External links

1921 films
Films of the Weimar Republic
German silent feature films
Films directed by Johannes Guter
German films based on plays
Films produced by Erich Pommer
German black-and-white films